Acanthocoris is the type genus of the tribe Acanthocorini, erected by Amyot and Serville in 1843.  Species of these leaf-footed bugs have been recorded from Africa and Asia.

Species
The Coreoidea Species File lists:
 Acanthocoris acutus Blöte, 1935
 Acanthocoris affinis (Westwood, 1842)
 Acanthocoris agilis Schouteden, 1938
 Acanthocoris anticus Walker, 1871
 Acanthocoris ariasi García Varela, 1913
 Acanthocoris callewaerti Schouteden, 1912
 Acanthocoris carlieri Schouteden, 1911
 Acanthocoris collarti Schouteden, 1938
 Acanthocoris declivicollis Blöte, 1935
 Acanthocoris delevali Schouteden, 1910
 Acanthocoris dentatus Haglund, 1895
 Acanthocoris distinctus Schouteden, 1938
 Acanthocoris elegans Blöte, 1935
 Acanthocoris erythraeensis Blöte, 1935
 Acanthocoris esau Distant, 1901
 Acanthocoris fasciculatus (Fabricius, 1781)
 Acanthocoris granosus (Stål, 1855)
 Acanthocoris granulosus Signoret, 1858
 Acanthocoris leopoldi Schouteden, 1929
 Acanthocoris liberiensis Blöte, 1935
 Acanthocoris lineatus Blöte, 1935
 Acanthocoris lugens Stål, 1855
 Acanthocoris major Blöte, 1935
 Acanthocoris mamillatus Blöte, 1935
 Acanthocoris obscuricornis Dallas, 1852
 Acanthocoris ruandanus Schouteden, 1957
 Acanthocoris rudis Blöte, 1935
 Acanthocoris scaber (Linnaeus, 1763)
 Acanthocoris scabrator (Fabricius, 1803) - type species (as Coreus scabrator)
 Acanthocoris scrofa (Germar, 1838)
 Acanthocoris sordidus (Thunberg, 1783)
 Acanthocoris speyeri Blöte, 1935
 Acanthocoris spinosus Signoret, 1858
 Acanthocoris spurcus (Germar, 1838)
 Acanthocoris terreus Bergroth, 1894
 Acanthocoris tibialis Signoret, 1861

References

External links
 
 

Coreidae genera
Coreinae